Dan Ballard may refer to:

Dan Ballard, American musician with the band Until June
Daniel Ballard (born 1999), Northern Irish footballer